Mentuhotep (also Montuhotep) is an ancient Egyptian name meaning "Montu is satisfied" and may refer to:

Kings 
 Mentuhotep I, nomarch at Thebes during the First Intermediate Period and first king of the 11th Dynasty
 Mentuhotep II, reunified Egypt at the end of the first intermediate period, thereby starting the Middle Kingdom of Egypt
 Mentuhotep III, successor of Mentuhotep II
 Mentuhotep IV, successor of Mentuhotep III, possibly overthrown by Amenemhat I, founder of the Twelfth Dynasty of Egypt
 Mentuhotep V, a ruler of the late 13th Dynasty during the Second Intermediate Period
 Mentuhotepi, ruler of the 16th Dynasty in Upper Egypt during the Second Intermediate Period
 Mentuhotep VI, a ruler of the late 16th Dynasty.

Others 
Mentuhotep (treasurer)
Mentuhotep (queen)
Mentuhotep (god's father), father of king Sobekhotep III

Ancient Egyptian given names